George Ridley may refer to:

George Ridley (Whig politician) (1818–1887), Member of Parliament for Newcastle-upon-Tyne 1856–1860
George Ridley (Labour politician) (1886–1944), Member of Parliament for Clay Cross 1936–1944
George "Geordie" Ridley (1835–1864), writer of Blaydon Races